Heaphy Spur is a prominent, curved, rock spur,  long, which descends from the southern side of the Clare Range and divides the head of Victoria Upper Glacier in Victoria Land, Antarctica. It was mapped by the United States Geological Survey from surveys and U.S. Navy aerial photography, 1947–62, and was named by the Advisory Committee on Antarctic Names in 1974 after William Heaphy, a New Zealand citizen who, over the past 10 years, had participated in the U.S. Antarctic Research Program.

References 

Ridges of Victoria Land
Scott Coast